Letter to Jane is a 1972 French postscript film to Tout Va Bien directed by Jean-Luc Godard and Jean-Pierre Gorin and made under the auspices of the Dziga Vertov Group. Narrated in a back-and-forth style by both Godard and Gorin, the film serves as a 52-minute cinematic essay that deconstructs a single news photograph of Jane Fonda in Vietnam. This was Godard and Gorin's final collaboration.

In 2005, the film was made available as an extra on the Tout va Bien DVD released by the Criterion Collection.

External links
IMDB link
Senses of Cinema article

French avant-garde and experimental films
Films directed by Jean-Luc Godard
1972 films
1970s avant-garde and experimental films
1970s French films